Libice nad Doubravou is a market town in Havlíčkův Brod District in the Vysočina Region of the Czech Republic. It has about 900 inhabitants.

Administrative parts
Villages and hamlets of Barovice, Chloumek, Kladruby, Křemenice, Lhůta, Libická Lhotka, Malochyně, Nehodovka and Spálava are administrative parts of Libice nad Doubravou.

Notable people
Jan Lála (born 1938), footballer

References

Populated places in Havlíčkův Brod District
Market towns in the Czech Republic